The Caucasus mixed forests is a temperate broadleaf and mixed forests ecoregion in the Caucasus Mountains, as well as the adjacent Lesser Caucasus range and the eastern end of the Pontic Mountains.

Geography
The main Caucasus chain, known as the Greater Caucasus, run from northwest to southeast, extending from north of the Black Sea eastwards to the Caspian Sea. The Caucasus forms the traditional border between Europe and Asia. The highest point in the Caucasus is Mount Elbrus (5,642 m). The ecoregion also includes the Lesser Caucasus or Anti-Caucasus range, which lies south of the Caucasus, as well as the eastern end of the Pontic Mountains, which extends along the southern shore of the Black Sea.

Climate
The climate is temperate, and varies with elevation. Average annual rainfall is generally higher in the western portion of the ecoregion, ranging from 1500 to 2000 mm in the western ranges along the Black Sea, to 600 to 1000 mm at the eastern and southern portions of the range.

Flora
The ecoregion's plant communities vary with elevation. 

Temperate mixed forests extend from 400 to 2200 meters elevation, covering about 70% of the ecoregion's area. Broadleaf trees are predominant at lower elevations, transitioning to conifer-dominated forests at higher elevations.

Between 400 and 1000 meters elevation, Georgian oak (Quercus iberica) and European hornbeam (Carpinus betulus) are the dominant trees, along with sweet chestnut (Castanea sativa) in the more humid western mountains. Oriental beech (Fagus orientalis) is dominant between 1000 and 1500 meters elevation, with Caucasian oak (Quercus macranthera) dominant in drier areas.

Conifers become dominant above 1500 meters elevation, including Nordmann fir (Abies nordmanniana), Caucasian spruce (Picea orientalis), and Caucasian pine (Pinus sylvestris var. hamata). Dwarf forests occur near the treeline at 1800 to 2000 meters elevation, mostly of birches (Betula pubescens var. litwinowii and Betula raddeana) in more humid areas, and oriental oak and Caucasian pine in drier areas.

Subalpine grasslands occur from 1800 to 2500 meters elevation, and alpine meadows from 2500 to 3000 meters, interspersed with   thickets of Rhododendron caucasicum between 2000 and 2800 meters, and areas of rock scree. Sub-nival plants and lichens grow from 3000 to 4000 meters elevation.

Fauna
Large hoofed mammals include the East Caucasian tur (Capra cylindricornis), West Caucasian tur (Capra caucasica), Caucasian chamois (Rupicapra rupicapra caucasica), mouflon (Ovis orientalis gmelini), Caspian red deer (Cervus elaphus maral), and wild goat (Capra aegagrus). The East Caucasian Tur and West Caucasian Tur are endemic to the eastern and western portions of the Caucasus Mountains, respectively. Large mammal predators include the Eurasian brown bear (Ursus arctos arctos), wolf (Canis lupus), and Caucasus leopard (Panthera pardus tulliana).

The ecoregion is home to the raptors golden eagle (Aquila chrysaetos) and lammergeier (Gypaetus barbatus). Other resident birds include the Caucasian grouse (Lyrurus mlokosiewiczi), Caucasian snowcock (Tetraogallus caucasicus), great rosefinch (Carpodacus rubicilla), and Güldenstädt's redstart (Phoenicurus erythrogaster). Native water birds include the gadwall (Mareca strepera), whooper swan (Cygnus cygnus), common pochard (Aythya ferina), greater scaup (Aythya marila), common goldeneye (Bucephala clangula), and Dalmatian pelican (Pelicanus crispus).

Protected areas
A 2017 assessment found that 30,540 km², or 18%, of the ecoregion is in protected areas. Protected areas include the Lagodekhi Protected Areas, Borjomi-Kharagauli and Tusheti National Parks, Zagatala State Reserve, and Caucasus Biosphere Reserve.

External link

References

Caucasus
Ecoregions of Asia
Ecoregions of Europe
Ecoregions of Armenia
Ecoregions of Azerbaijan
Ecoregions of Georgia (country)
Ecoregions of Russia
Ecoregions of Turkey

Geography of the Caucasus
Montane forests
.
.
.
.
.

Environment of Abkhazia
Forests of Armenia
Forests of Azerbaijan
Forests of Russia
Forests of Turkey
Palearctic ecoregions
Temperate broadleaf and mixed forests